The Archdiocese of Puebla de los Ángeles is a Latin Church ecclesiastical territory or archdiocese of the Catholic Church. It is the oldest Catholic diocese in Mexico. It was established on October 13, 1525 as the "Diocese of Tlaxcala" and retained that name until it was elevated to an archdiocese in 1903. In 1959 a new Diocese of Tlaxcala was created and is suffragan to the Archdiocese of Puebla de los Ángeles.

A separate diocese seated in Mexico City was created in 1530 and replaced the Archdiocese of Seville in Spain as Tlaxcala's metropolitan see in 1546. While its place as Mexico's most important Catholic see was short-lived, the Archdiocese of Puebla de los Ángeles is one of the largest archdioceses in Mexico today. Now a metropolitan see itself, within the ecclesiastical province of Puebla de los Ángeles contains two suffragan dioceses: Huajuapan de León and Tehuacán.

Bishops

Ordinaries

Coadjutor bishop
José Ignacio Márquez y Tóriz (1934–1945)

Auxiliary bishops
Francisco Juan Leiza (de Leyva) (1739–1747)
Miguel Anselmo Álvarez de Abreu y Valdéz (1749–1765), appointed Bishop of Antequera, Oaxaca
José Ignacio Márquez y Tóriz (1934), appointed Coadjutor here
Emilio Abascal y Salmerón (1953–1968), appointed Archbishop of Jalapa (Xalapa), Veracruz
Ricardo Guízar Díaz (1970–1977), appointed Auxiliary Bishop of Aguascalientes
Rosendo Huesca Pacheco (1970–1977), appointed Archbishop here
Eugenio Andrés Lira Rugarcía (2011–2016), appointed Bishop of Matamoros, Tamaulipas
Dagoberto Sosa Arriaga (2011–2013), appointed Bishop of Tlapa, Guerrero
Tomás López Durán (2013–
Rutilo Felipe Pozos Lorenzini (2013–2020), appointed Bishop of Roman Catholic Diocese of Ciudad Obregón

Other priests of this diocese who became bishops
Joaquín Fernández de Madrid y Canal, appointed titular Bishop in 1834
Luis Munive Escobar, appointed Bishop of Tlaxcala in 1959
Bartolomé Carrasco Briseño, appointed Bishop of Huejutla, Hidalgo in 1963
José Trinidad Medel Pérez, appointed Bishop of Tula, Hidalgo in 1986

References

See also

List of Roman Catholic archdioceses in México
Puebla City
Tlaxcala City

Roman Catholic dioceses in Mexico
Religious organizations established in the 1520s
Christian organizations established in 1903
Roman Catholic dioceses established in the 16th century
Puebla
 
Puebla de los Angeles, Roman Catholic Archdiocese of
1525 establishments in the Spanish Empire